Saint-Salvi-de-Carcavès is a commune in the Tarn department in southern France.

Geography
The river Dadou has its source in the commune.

See also
Communes of the Tarn department

References

Communes of Tarn (department)